GOST 16876-71 is a romanization system (for transliteration of Russian Cyrillic alphabet texts into the Latin alphabet) devised by the National Administration for Geodesy and Cartography of the Soviet Union. It is based on the scientific transliteration system used in linguistics.  GOST was an international standard so it included provision for a number of the languages of the Soviet Union. The standard was revised twice in 1973 and 1980 with minor changes.

GOST 16876-71 contains two tables of a transliteration:
 Table 1: one Cyrillic char to one Latin char, some with diacritics
 Table 2: one Cyrillic char to one or many Latin char, but without diacritics

In 1978, COMECON adopted GOST 16876-71 with minor modifications as its official transliteration standard, under the name of SEV 1362-78.

GOST 16876-71 was used by the United Nations to develop its romanization system for geographical names, which was adopted for official use by the United Nations at the Fifth United Nations Conference on the Standardization of Geographical Names in Montreal, Quebec, Canada, in 1987. UN system relies on diacritics to compensate for non-Russian Cyrillic alphabets.

In 2002, the Russian Federation along with a number of CIS countries abandoned the use of GOST 16876 in favor of ISO 9:1995, which was adopted as GOST 7.79-2000.

Russian 

  Notes
 * In parenthesis the acceptable additional variants are shown.
 † It is recommended to use c before i, e, y, and j, and cz in all other cases.
 ‡ Cyrillic і in Ukrainian and Belorussian is always transliterated as Latin i, as well as in Old Russian and Old Bulgarian texts where it is usually used before vowels. In the rare case where it falls before a consonant (for example, in the word міръ) it is transliterated with an apostrophe i'.

The letters і, ѳ, ѣ, ѵ are found in texts from before the Russian orthographic reform of 1918.

Ukrainian 
During 1995—2009 the Ukrainian Derzhstandart tried to introduce the new system of transliteration instead of the Soviet one, though none of the draft projects were accepted officially.

Note: * System B (without diacritics)

See also 
 Romanization of Russian
 Romanization of Ukrainian
 GOST standards

References

External links

Official documents 
  GOST 16876—71  
 GOST 16876—71 (1981), scan
 GOST 7.79—2000 
 
 Report on the Current Status of United Nations Romanization Systems for Geographical Names, compiled by the UNGEGN Working Group on Romanization Systems; Version 2.2, January 2003.

Romanization of Cyrillic
Russian language
GOST standards